John Caulfield Hannyngton (7 March 1807 – 1885 or 1886) was a British military commander, actuary and mathematician. He is remembered as inventor of a slide rule of previously unattainable precision.

History 
Hannyngton was born in Dungannon, County Tyrone, Ireland, a son of Thomas Knox Hannyngton and Mrs Hannyngton, née Caulfield or Caulfeild.

He joined the British Army as a cadet in 1825 and was posted to India with the 24th Regiment of Native Infantry. On the suppression of the Colekan rebellion in 1839 he was given a political appointment, and in 1842 promoted to Judicial Commissioner.
He was promoted to Lieutenant-Colonel in 1856 and took command of the 63rd RNI. At the time of the Indian mutiny of 1857 he was with his regiment, which was disarmed but did not rebel. He was transferred to the Military Finance Department on the strength of his competence with figures, and finally promoted to Military Auditor-General which post he held until 1861 when he retired.

It was manufactured in England by Aston & Mander and a demonstration of its capabilities was made by one Galbraith SFTCD before students of Trinity College Engineering School and reported in Freeman's Journal of 11 June 1884. Examples are today highly collectible.

Recognition 
 Hannyngton was elected Fellow of the Royal Astronomical Society on 12 March 1875
 He was elected a Fellow of the Institute of Actuaries

Family 
Son John Child Hannyngton (23 September 1835 – March 1895) was born in Barrackpore.

Publications

References

External links 
 Hannyngton Slide Rule
 Hannyngton Slide Rule in Rod Lovett's collection A very fine set of photographs.

1807 births
1880s deaths

Year of birth uncertain
Irish mathematicians
Irish actuaries
British East India Company Army officers
19th-century Irish businesspeople
People from County Tyrone